Shaft is a census-designated place (CDP) corresponding to the unincorporated community of Borden Shaft in Allegany County, Maryland, United States. As of the 2010 census, the CDP had a population of 235. It is located south of Frostburg, in the Georges Creek Valley. Borden, or Borden Shaft, was the site of a major deep mine in the valley. The principal owners of the mines were the Borden family of Massachusetts. Deep mines were unusual in the area, as most were drift mines in the Big Vein region. In 1907, the mine operator was H. and W. Hitchens Coal company. The C&P railroad delivered the windlass for the mine, then used its railroad crane to set it in place.

Demographics

References

Census-designated places in Allegany County, Maryland
Census-designated places in Maryland